Pocket Bicycles was the name of a manufacturer of portable bicycles located in Cambridge, Massachusetts in the 1970s.

Design innovations
While resembling many of the small-wheel folding bicycle designs of the time, the bicycle was distinctive in reducing the flexion of the down tube and hinge by use of cables kept under tension by the weight of the rider, saving weight and space compared to use of rigid tubing braces. Use of cables provided reduction of excessive vertical flex in the frame while still allowing easy adjustment of the degree of flexion retained, to act as a tunable suspension system absorbing much of the bumpiness of the ride normally associated with small wheel bicycles.

See also
 Bicycle frame
 Guy (sailing) 
 Aeronautical wire bracing
 Stays (nautical)

References 

Cycle manufacturers of the United States
Folding bicycles